Nisennenmondai (にせんねんもんだい) are a Tokyo-based instrumental trio. They formed in 1999 and took their name from the Japanese translation of the then-current phrase "Y2K bug."

Formation
Guitarist Masako Takada, bassist Yuri Zaikawa, and drummer Sayaka Himeno met at a club near their university and formed the band soon after.
The band have mostly released music on their own Bijin label. The compilation album "Neji/Tori" was released by Norway's Smalltown Supersound in 2008. The band are known for their dynamic live show, and despite little mainstream media attention, have built a substantial international following. They have played dates in Australia, Austria, Croatia, Denmark (including Roskilde Festival), France, Germany, the Netherlands, Italy, Norway. Switzerland, Sweden, UK and USA. The band toured the US in 2004 and 2005. In April 2011 they performed on the main stage at Sonar Sound Tokyo. In May 2011, Nisennenmondai launched an extensive European tour.

Style
Described by allmusic's Heather Phares as "taking as much inspiration from the cool kids at school as they did from experimentalists like This Heat, The Pop Group, Sonic Youth, DNA and Neu!"  Nisennenmondai compose raw and repetitive (post) punk instrumentals, which can be groove-oriented whilst also having a no wave/disco vibe. Himeno tirelessly pounds at her snare and bass drum while slashing her cymbals, while Takada adds layers of delay and clangy sounding distortion.

"With walls of distortion and a pummeling rhythmic backbone that fluctuates between krautrock`s repetition  and free-rock calamity, bassist Zai, guitarist Ma-Chan and drummer Hime have formed an unassuming juggernaut” 
(Dazed & Confused).

Prefuse 73 said in an interview with Dazed & Confused; "John Stanier from Battles had told me that they were sick. They start to play. Next thing you know, these three tiny diminutive women were making us look like idiots because they were so incredible". The band were chosen by Battles to perform at the ATP Nightmare Before Christmas festival, that they co-curated in December 2011 in Minehead, England.

Discography
2004: Sorede Souzousuru Neji
2005: Tori
2006: Rokuon
2007: DJ nisennenmondai (bijin002)
2008: Neji/Tori
2009: Destination Tokyo
2009: Fan
2009: goA
2011: nobetsumakunashikodomotachi original soundtrack (bijin007)
2011: Live
2012: sounds before sleeping (bijin022)
2013: N
2013: Nisennenmondai EP (Zelone Records)
2014: no title (bijin025)
2015: N''' (Bijin Record)
2015: Live at Clouds Hill2016: #N/A  (On-U Sound; On-U LP131)
2016: #6 12" Single (On-U Sound; On-U DP60)
2016: E'' (bijin028)

References

Japanese post-rock groups
Japanese instrumental musical groups
Japanese indie rock groups
Japanese alternative rock groups
Japanese experimental rock groups
Musical groups from Tokyo
All-female bands
Smalltown Supersound artists